Sharad Kumar may refer to 

Sharad Kumar (athlete), Indian para high jumper
Sharad Kumar (bureaucrat), chief of National Investigation Agency
Sharad Chauhan, also known as Sharad Kumar, member of Legislative Assembly of Delhi
Sharad Kumar Dixit, American plastic surgeon, Padma Shri awardee
Sharad Kumar, Indian actor who appears in the 1975 film Sholay